NaCl is the chemical formula for sodium chloride, table salt.

NaCl may also refer to:
 Saline (medicine), the salt solution used as a medication
 NaCl (software), a public domain networking and cryptography library
 Google NaCl, a sandboxing technology

See also 
Naci (disambiguation)
NAC1 (disambiguation)